Yermolov may refer to:

 Aleksey Petrovich Yermolov, Russian Imperial general of the 19th century who commanded Russian troops in the Caucasus War, Russo-Persian Wars, and Napoleonic Wars
 Alexey Yermolov (disambiguation), several meanings
 Alexander Petrovich Yermolov  (1754–1834), Russian courtier
 Alexey Sergeyevich Yermolov